A content  repository or content store is a database of digital content with an associated set of data management, search and access methods allowing application-independent access to the content, rather like a digital library, but with the ability to store and modify content in addition to searching and retrieving. The content repository acts as the storage engine for a larger application such as a content management system or a document management system, which adds a user interface on top of the repository's application programming interface.

Advantages provided by repositories

Common rules for data access allow many applications to work with the same content without interrupting the data.
They give out signals when changes happen, letting other applications using the repository know that something has been modified, which enables collaborative data management.
Developers can deal with data using programs that are more compatible with the desktop programming environment.
The data model is scriptable when users use a content repository.

Content repository features 
A content repository may provide functionality such as:
 Add/edit/delete content
 Hierarchy and sort order management
 Query / search
 Versioning
 Access control
 Import / export
 Locking
 Life-cycle management
 Retention and holding / records management

Examples 

 Apache Jackrabbit
 ModeShape

Applications
Content management
Document management
Digital asset management
Records management
Revision control
Social collaboration
Web content management

Standards and specification 
Content repository API for Java
WebDAV
Content Management Interoperability Services

See also 
 Information repository
 Content (media)

References

External links
 DB-Engines Ranking of Content Stores by popularity, updated monthly

Data management
Content management systems